Beyi may refer to:

Bəyi, a village in Azerbaijan
Bey, an Ottoman title
Bey, a word, playable in word's with friend's